The Fujifilm X-A2 is a rangefinder-styled digital mirrorless camera announced by Fujifilm on January 15, 2015, and released in the UK on March 1, 2015.

Features
The Fujifilm X-A2 is the first X-mount camera with a 175° LCD screen. It is aimed at the growing selfie market, with new face detection and eye detection autofocus modes, for sharper results when taking Self portraits. It was also among the one of the first of the X-mount line up to have the new Chrome film simulation as a preset 

The Fujifilm X-A2 sports a regular Bayer filter sensor array, as opposed to the X-Trans sensor that is typical among the X-mount camera system.

The camera was designed in such a way that it could be used one handed, so all of the most used settings are within reach when using the camera in selfie mode.

Key Features 
 16.3 Megapixels
 23.6 x 16.6mm CMOS sensor (APS-C)
 TTL 256-zone metering, Multi / Spot / Average
 Face detection
 Eye detection
 1080p HD video
 WiFi connectivity

Reception 
The Fujifilm X-A2 sold very well in the Asian markets, more so than in most  Western countries, however this remains a popular camera among the younger generation.

References

External links
Specifications
Dpreview.com

X-A2
Cameras introduced in 2015